Mammillaria hahniana, the old lady cactus, is a species of flowering plant in the family Cactaceae, native to central Mexico. The solitary spherical stems, 12 cm in diameter, are covered in white down and white spines. Reddish purple flowers are borne in spring and summer, sometimes forming a complete ring around the apex of the plant.

Its status is listed as "Near Threatened" by the IUCN Red List.

Cultivation
Mammillaria hahniana is one of several Mammillaria species to be cultivated. In temperate regions it must be grown under glass with heat. Like all cacti it must be kept dry in winter, and fed and watered during the active growth cycle in summer. Increasing quite readily and flowering at a relatively early age, it is a suitable subject for domestic cultivation. It has gained the Royal Horticultural Society's Award of Garden Merit.

References

hahniana
Cacti of Mexico
Endemic flora of Mexico
Flora of Central Mexico